Spas-Klepiki is a town and the administrative center of Klepikovsky District in Ryazan Oblast, Russia, located on the Pra River (Oka's tributary)  northeast of Ryazan, the administrative center of the oblast. Population:

History
It was founded in the 16th century as a settlement of Klepiki and granted town status in 1920.

Administrative and municipal status
Within the framework of administrative divisions, Spas-Klepiki serves as the administrative center of Klepikovsky District. As an administrative division, it is, together with eight rural localities, incorporated within Klepikovsky District as the town of district significance of Spas-Klepiki. As a municipal division, the town of district significance of Spas-Klepiki is incorporated within Klepikovsky Municipal District as Spas-Klepikovskoye Urban Settlement.

References

Notes

Sources

Cities and towns in Ryazan Oblast
Ryazansky Uyezd